Hulu Terengganu (Upper Terengganu) is an interior district of Terengganu, Malaysia. The local government of this district is Hulu Terengganu District Council.

Background
Hulu Terengganu is the largest district in terms of land area and the only landlocked district in Terengganu. Hulu Terengganu District Council was established on 1 January 1981 under the 3rd Section of Local Government Act 1976 (Act 171) (Amendment 1978). Prior to this it was known as Jumaah Bandaran Ulu Terengganu. It was formally launched by the Menteri Besar of Terengganu at the time, Wan Mokhtar Ahmad, at the Penghulu Diman Municipal Hall on Monday, 30 August 1982.

The population in 2000 was numbered at 74,918, 3,586 more than during MDHT's early years (year 1970). This has now decreased to just above 70,000. Hulu Terengganu has one village for Orang Asli, the indigenous people of Peninsular Malaysia, which is Kampung Sungai Berua.

Administrative divisions

Hulu Terengganu District is divided into 10 mukims, which are:
Hulu Berang
Hulu Telemung
Hulu Terengganu
Jenagur
Kuala Berang
Kuala Telemung
Penghulu Diman
Tanggul
Tersat
Kuala Berang town

Demographics

Culture and places of interest

The district is where the famous Terengganu Inscription Stone was found. It was accidentally discovered near Sungai Tersat by an Arab trader named Sayid Husin bin Ghulam al-Bokhari in 1899 after a flash flood hit Kuala Berang. The inscription on the stone proclaims Islam as the state religion of Terengganu. This artifact is a symbol of an earlier arrival of Islam to the Malay Peninsula, even earlier from that of Malacca Sultanate. It is now displayed in Terengganu State Museum.

As an interior district, forest still occupied a large area of the district. The district is particularly popular for Tasik Kenyir or Kenyir Lake. Kenyir Lake is an artificial lake created in 1985 by the damming of the Kenyir River to create the Sultan Mahmud Power Station. It is the largest man-made lake in South East Asia. Because the lake is a reservoir, the water level can vary depending on the month. The water level is highest in March and April.

Although an artificial lake, the area has been developed for eco-tourism, and there are many resorts around its shores. Fishing is common, as are jungle treks, waterfalls and caves. According to the locals, the best season for fishing is August when the water level is lower. Jungle trekking sites include Pengkalan Gawi, Bewah at National Park, along the rivers of Saok, Lasir, Tembat and Lawit. Kayaking, canoeing, boating, rafting and rapids shooting are among the water sport activities available here.

Other places of interest in Hulu Terengganu are Lata Belukar Bukit and Sekayu Waterfall. Lata Belukar Bukit is a newly developed area and is popular among the locals. Belukar Bukit is a picnic and camping site. Its natural environment as well as coolness from the waters are the main attractions to this place.

Federal Parliament and State Assembly Seats 

List of Hulu Terengganu district representatives in the Federal Parliament (Dewan Rakyat)

List of Hulu Terengganu district representatives in the State Legislative Assembly of Terengganu

Schools in Hulu Terengganu 
 Politeknik Hulu Terengganu
 Sekolah Kebangsaan Sungai Berua, Hulu Terengganu
 Sekolah Kebangsaan Seri Buluh, Hulu Terengganu
 Sekolah Kebangsaan Kuala Ping, Hulu Terengganu
 Sekolah Kebangsaan Dusun, Hulu Terengganu
 Sekolah Kebangsaan Teris, Hulu Terengganu
 Akademik Binaan Malaysia (Wilayah Timur)
 Sekolah Kebangsaan Kemat, Hulu Terengganu
 Sekolah Kebangsaan Nibong
 Sekolah Imtiaz Kuala Berang
 Sekolah Menengah Sains Hulu Terengganu
 Sekolah Kebangsaan Tengku Ampuan Intan
 Sekolah Kebangsaan Kuala Berang
 Sekolah Kebangsaan Seri Berang
 Sekolah Menengah Kebangsaan Tengku Ampuan Intan (Sekolah Premier)
 Sekolah Menengah Agama Mahmudiah
 Sekolah Menengah Kebangsaan Seri Berang
 Sekolah Menengah Kebangsaan Ajil
 Kolej Tingkatan Enam Hulu Terengganu
 Maktab Rendah Sains Mara (MRSM) Kuala Berang

See also

 Districts of Malaysia

Notes

References